Desulfovibrio bastinii is a moderately halophilic bacteria. It is sulfate-reducing, mesophilic and motile. Its type strain is SRL4225T (=DSM 16055T =ATCC BAA-903T).

References

Further reading
Staley, James T., et al. "Bergey's manual of systematic bacteriology, vol. 3. "Williams and Wilkins, Baltimore, MD (2012).
Sigalevich, Pavel, and Yehuda Cohen. "Oxygen-Dependent Growth of the Sulfate-Reducing Bacterium Desulfovibrio oxyclinae in Coculture withMarinobacter sp. Strain MB in an Aerated Sulfate-Depleted Chemostat."Applied and Environmental Microbiology 66.11 (2000): 5019–5023.

External links 
LPSN

Type strain of Desulfovibrio bastinii at BacDive -  the Bacterial Diversity Metadatabase

Bacteria described in 2004
Desulfovibrio